Bird J. Vincent (March 6, 1880 – July 18, 1931) was a soldier and politician from the U.S. state of Michigan.

Early life
Vincent was born in Brandon Township near Clarkston, Michigan.

Education
Vincent attended the public schools of Oakland and Midland Counties and Ferris Institute (now Ferris State University) in Mecosta County.  He graduated from the law department of the University of Michigan at Ann Arbor in 1905, and was admitted to the bar the same year, and commenced practice in Saginaw.

Career
He served as assistant prosecuting attorney of Saginaw County from 1909 to 1914 and prosecuting attorney from 1915 to 1917.  In 1917, Vincent resigned to enter the Army.  During World War I, he served ten months in France as a first lieutenant of the Sixth Train Headquarters and in the Three Hundred and Second Train Headquarters.  After the war, he served as city attorney of Saginaw from 1919 to 1923.  In 1922, Vincent was elected as a Republican from Michigan's 8th congressional district to the 68th Congress, and subsequently re-elected to the four succeeding Congressional terms, serving from March 4, 1923 until his death in 1931.  He was chairman of the Committee on Elections No. 2 in the 69th and 71st Congresses.

Death
Vincent died of heart disease, in office, while en route to San Francisco from Honolulu, Hawaii on board the transport USS Henderson.  He interred in Forest Lawn Cemetery, Saginaw, Michigan.

See also
List of United States Congress members who died in office (1900–49)

References

The Political Graveyard

1880 births
1931 deaths
Ferris State University alumni
University of Michigan Law School alumni
Republican Party members of the United States House of Representatives from Michigan
People who died at sea
United States Army officers
20th-century American politicians
People from Oakland County, Michigan
Military personnel from Michigan